Muthesius Academy of Art (German: Muthesius Kunsthochschule) is an art school and is located in the city of Kiel in Schleswig-Holstein, Germany. The school was named for architect Hermann Muthesius. The school was founded in 1907 as an Arts and Crafts (movement) and handicraft school, the current version of the school including the name and art school status started in 2005.

History 
The school was founded in 1907 under the name Städtische Handwerker und Kunstgewerbeschule (English: Municipal Crafts and Arts and Crafts School). In 1910, the name changed to, Technische und kunstgewerbliche Fachschule (English: Technical and Arts and Crafts School). After World War II in 1945, the name changed to, Muthesius-Werkschule Kiel für Handwerk und angewandte Kunst (English: Muthesius Werkschule Kiel for Handicrafts and Applied Arts). In 1966, it was renamed, Muthesius-Werkkunstschule (English: Muthesius Work Art School).

From 1972 to 1974, the school was incorporated into Kiel University of Applied Sciences. However in 1974, the school became independent again under the name, Muthesius-Hochschule – Fachhochschule für Kunst und Gestaltung (English: Muthesius University - University of Applied Sciences for Art and Design). In 2005, the school officially became an art school and started using the current name, Muthesius Kunsthochschule.

Notable alumni

Notable faculty

References

External links 

 

Art schools in Germany
Educational institutions in Germany
Universities and colleges in Schleswig-Holstein
Buildings and structures in Kiel
1907 establishments in Germany